The 2016–17 Women's National Cricket League season was the 21st season of the Women's National Cricket League, the women's domestic limited overs cricket competition in Australia. The tournament started on 13 October 2016 and finished on 3 December 2016. Defending champions South Australian Scorpions finished fourth. New South Wales Breakers won the tournament for the 18th time after finishing second on the ladder and beating Queensland Fire in the final. Meg Lanning was named player of the tournament.

Ladder

Fixtures

Round 1

Round 2

Round 3

Final

Statistics

Highest totals

Most runs

Most wickets

References

Notes

Bibliography

External links
 WNCL 2016–17 on cricket.com.au
 Series home at ESPNcricinfo

 
Women's National Cricket League seasons
 
Women's National Cricket League